Aino Maria Susanna Haapoja (November 13, 1966 – May 30, 2009) was a Finnish politician in the Centre Party. Haapoja was born in Kauhava and became a Member of Parliament in 2003 and was elected for a second term in 2007. In 2005, she became the chair of the Kauhava city council. She was an agrologist by training.

Haapoja died aged 42 in Tampere after having suffered a cerebral hemorrhage the previous day. Her father, Kalevi Haapoja, is an actor.

References 

1966 births
2009 deaths
People from Kauhava
Centre Party (Finland) politicians
Members of the Parliament of Finland (2003–07)
Members of the Parliament of Finland (2007–11)